The Guatemala City Guatemala Temple (formerly the Guatemala City Temple) is the 34th constructed and 32nd operating temple of the Church of Jesus Christ of Latter-day Saints (LDS Church).  Located in Guatemala City, capital city of Guatemala, it was built with a modern six-spire design.

History
In 1956, while Harold B. Lee (then a member of the Quorum of the Twelve) visited Guatemala City, he felt that it would be a center for Lamanite gatherings and predicted that a temple would be built there.

The LDS Church temple in Guatemala City was announced on April 1, 1981, and dedicated on December 14, 1984 by Gordon B. Hinckley.

Carmen O'Donnal was the first matron of the temple and was also the first native of Guatemala to be baptized into the LDS Church. Clate W. Mask, Jr. was a former temple president.

In 2011, a second temple in Guatemala, the Quetzaltenango Guatemala Temple, was dedicated by Dieter F. Uchtdorf.

In 2020, the Guatemala City Guatemala Temple was closed temporarily during the year in response to the coronavirus pandemic.

See also
 

 Comparison of temples of The Church of Jesus Christ of Latter-day Saints
 List of temples of The Church of Jesus Christ of Latter-day Saints
 List of temples of The Church of Jesus Christ of Latter-day Saints by geographic region
 Temple architecture (Latter-day Saints)
 The Church of Jesus Christ of Latter-day Saints in Guatemala

References

External links
 Guatemala City Guatemala Temple Official site
 Guatemala City Guatemala Temple at ChurchofJesusChristTemples.org
  Guatemala City Guatemala Temple page with interior photos

20th-century Latter Day Saint temples
Buildings and structures in Guatemala City
Religious buildings and structures in Guatemala
Religious buildings and structures completed in 1984
Temples (LDS Church) in Latin America
Temples (LDS Church) in Guatemala
Temple
1984 establishments in Guatemala